The Egyptian Open is the national open golf tournament of Egypt. It was first played in 1921, and is the oldest professional competition in the Middle East. During the early 1950s, it was contested by many of the world's leading golfers, with winners including Bobby Locke and Bernard Hunt.

In 2009, the tournament once again attracted an international field including eight time European Tour Order of Merit winner and captain of the 2010 European Ryder Cup team Colin Montgomerie. During the event, it was announced that a deal had been signed which would see the Egyptian Open become an event on the second tier Challenge Tour for a minimum of three years from 2010.

The Challenge Tour last visited Egypt in 2004 for the Al Ahram-Jolie Ville Sharm El Sheikh Challenge.

Winners

Sources:

Notes

References

External links

Coverage on the Challenge Tour's official site

Former Challenge Tour events
Golf tournaments in Egypt

nl:Egyptisch Open